Monmouth by-election may refer to one of four Parliamentary by-elections held for the British House of Commons constituency of Monmouth in South Wales:

1934 Monmouth by-election
1939 Monmouth by-election
1945 Monmouth by-election
1991 Monmouth by-election

See also
Monmouth (UK Parliament constituency)